Steve Smith Playhouse is a Canadian English language television series. It was produced by S&S Productions and debuted in 2004.

The series consisted of 13 half-hour episodes hosted, written and directed by Canadian actor and comedian Steve Smith. In each episode Smith takes one specific B-movie from the 1950s or 1960s, condenses them to a half-hour and uses his voice to replace that of the lead character, while all the other characters’ performances remain untouched, often changing the plot and tone of the original movie.

Broadcasters
 Space - original broadcaster
 Drive-In Classics - secondary broadcaster (reruns)

References

External links
 

2004 Canadian television series debuts
2004 Canadian television series endings
CTV Sci-Fi Channel original programming
Television series by S&S Productions
2000s Canadian comedy television series
English-language television shows